was a town located in Yamato District, Fukuoka Prefecture, Japan.

As of 2003, the town had an estimated population of 16,943 and a density of 743.77 persons per km². The total area was 22.78 km².

On March 21, 2005, Yamato, along with the town of Mitsuhashi (also from Yamato District), was merged into the expanded city of Yanagawa.

History
The town was established as a village in 1907, and promoted to a town in 1952.

External links
 Yanagawa official website 

Dissolved municipalities of Fukuoka Prefecture
Populated places established in 1907
Populated places disestablished in 2005
2005 disestablishments in Japan